The 1997 Algerian Cup Final was the 33rd final of the Algerian Cup. The final took place on July 5, 1997, at Stade 5 Juillet 1962 in Algiers with kick-off at 15:00. USM Alger beat CA Batna 1-0 to win their fourth Algerian Cup.

Pre-match

Details

References

Cup
Algeria
Algerian Cup Finals
USM Alger matches